Stephen Peter "Steve" Clark, Jr. (November 19, 1923 – June 4, 1996) was an American politician who served as mayor of Dade County (now Miami-Dade County), Florida from 1970 to 1972 and from 1974 to April 1993, when a federal judge abolished the post. He was also mayor of Miami from 1967 to 1970 and from 1993 to his death from stomach cancer.

The Stephen P. Clark Government Center, the county hall of Miami-Dade County, is named in his honor. He is the brother of Dick Clark.

Sources
Musical Mayors
Ex-Mayor of Miami Gets His Job Back

1923 births
1996 deaths
Mayors of Miami
Mayors of Miami-Dade County, Florida
20th-century American politicians
Politicians from Manhattan, Kansas